Gough was an electoral district of the Legislative Assembly in the Australian state of New South Wales, named after the Gough County, which includes the town of Glen Innes. It was created in the 1904 re-distribution of electorates following the 1903 New South Wales referendum, which required the number of members of the Legislative Assembly to be reduced from 125 to 90. It consisted of the abolished seat of Glenn Innes and part of Inverell.

In 1920, with the introduction of proportional representation, it was absorbed into Northern Tablelands, along with Armidale and Tenterfield.

Members for Gough

Election results

References

Former electoral districts of New South Wales
Constituencies established in 1904
1904 establishments in Australia
Constituencies disestablished in 1920
1920 disestablishments in Australia
New England (New South Wales)